In statistics, the Hannan–Quinn information criterion (HQC) is a criterion for model selection. It is an alternative to Akaike information criterion (AIC) and Bayesian information criterion (BIC). It is given as

 

where  is the log-likelihood, k is the number of parameters, and n is the number of observations.

Burnham & Anderson (2002, p. 287) say that HQC, "while often cited, seems to have seen little use in practice".  They also note that HQC, like BIC, but unlike AIC, is not an estimator of Kullback–Leibler divergence. Claeskens & Hjort (2008, ch. 4) note that HQC, like BIC, but unlike AIC, is not asymptotically efficient; however, it misses the optimal estimation rate by a very small   factor. They further point out that whatever method is being used for fine-tuning the criterion will be more important in practice than the term , since this latter number is small even for very large ; however, the  term ensures that, unlike AIC, HQC is strongly consistent. It follows from the law of the iterated logarithm that any strongly consistent method must miss efficiency by at least a  factor, so in this sense HQC is asymptotically very well-behaved. Van der Pas and Grünwald prove  that model selection based on a modified Bayesian estimator, the so-called switch distribution, in many cases behaves asymptotically like HQC, while retaining the advantages of Bayesian methods such as the use of priors etc.

See also
 Akaike information criterion
 Bayesian information criterion
 Deviance information criterion
 Focused information criterion
 Hannan–Quinn information criterion
 Shibata information criterion

References

 Aznar Grasa, A. (1989). Econometric Model Selection: A New Approach, Springer. 
 Burnham, K.P. and Anderson, D.R. (2002). Model Selection and Multimodel Inference: A Practical Information-Theoretic Approach, 2nd ed. Springer-Verlag. .
 Claeskens, G. and Hjort, N.L. (2008). Model Selection and Model Averaging, Cambridge.
 Hannan, E. J., and B. G. Quinn (1979), "The Determination of the order of an autoregression", Journal of the Royal Statistical Society, Series B, 41: 190–195.
 Van der Pas, S.L.; Grünwald, P.D. (2017). "Almost the best of three worlds." To appear in  Statistica Sinica,  DOI 10.5705/ss.202016.0011, 2017.
 Chen, C et al. Order Determination for Autoregressive Processes Using Resampling methods Statistica Sinica 3:1993, http://www3.stat.sinica.edu.tw/statistica/oldpdf/A3n214.pdf

Regression variable selection
Model selection